Poornima a.k.a. Poornima Rao (born 1966) is an Indian actress who starred in many Telugu, Tamil, Kannada and Malayalam films in the early and mid-1980s.

Career

She acted in 100 movies including Telugu, Tamil, Kannada and Malayalam. Her films include Harischandra, Ilakkangal, Srivariki Premalekha, Naalugu Sthambhalaata, Marali Goodige, Prema Sakshi, and Maa Pallelo Gopaludu. She acted in Malayalam movies with the stage name Sudha. She is from Machilipatnam, Andhra Pradesh, India.

Filmography

Telugu

Tamil: Credited as Poornima/Poornima Rao
 Saranam Ayyappa (1980)
 Kilinjalgal (1981)... Usha, Julie's friend (credited as Sudha)
 Magane Magane (1982)
 Oru Pullanguzhal Aduppuppthugirathu (1983)
 Dhavani Kanavugal (1984)
 Porutham (1985)
 Unnai Vidamatten (1985)
 Thangachi Kalyanam (1989)

Malayalam: Credited as Sudha
 Ilakkangal (1980)... Amminikutty
 Enthino Pookunna Pookkal (1982)... Sumathi
 Ruby My Darling (1982)
 Vaarikuzhi (1982)
 Swantham Sarika (1984)
 Sandhya Mayangum Neram (1983)... Shanthi

Kannada: Credited as Poornima
 Maryade Mahalu (1984)
 Prema Sakshi (1984)
 Marali Goodige (1984)
 Beegara Pandya (1986)

References

External links
 https://web.archive.org/web/20110716210045/http://www.telugupedia.com/wiki/index.php?title=Machilipatnam
 https://www.moviebuff.com/poornima-devi

Living people
Telugu people
Actresses in Malayalam cinema
Actresses in Telugu cinema
Indian film actresses
21st-century Indian actresses
People from Machilipatnam
People from Krishna district
Actresses from Andhra Pradesh
Actresses in Tamil cinema
Actresses in Kannada cinema
1968 births